"Hitoiro" (一色; One Color) is Mika Nakashima's 20th single overall and her second under the name Nana starring Mika Nakashima. This single was released on the 29 November 2006. The single was the main themes of "Nana 2" and her last single under the name Nana starring Mika Nakashima. The B-side, "Eyes for the Moon" also featured in the movie.

Track listing

Charts
"Hitoiro" only managed to debut at #4 in the daily charts. It reached #3 for the weekly charts with 33,015 copies sold in the first week. Furthermore, "Hitoiro" did not sell as well as "Glamorous Sky", which became the top-selling female single of 2005. However, it has sold 100,543 copies.
 
Total Reported Sales: 100,543* (as of 2008.04.04, last charting week)

2006 singles
2006 songs
Mika Nakashima songs
Japanese film songs